Oregon Ballot Measure 57 (2008) or Senate Bill (SB) 1087 was a legislatively referred state statute that increased term of imprisonment for persons convicted of specified drug and property crimes under certain circumstances. The measure enacted law which prohibits courts from imposing less than a presumptive sentence for persons convicted of specified drug and property crimes under certain circumstances, and requires the Department of Corrections to provide treatment to certain offenders and to administer grant program to provide supplemental funding to local governments for certain purposes.

Official Ballot Title
Increases Sentences For Drug Trafficking, Theft Against Elderly And Specified Repeat Property And Identity Theft Crimes; Requires Addiction Treatment For Certain Offenders

Background

Competing ballot measures
A similar measure, (Oregon Ballot Measure 61 (2008), proposed by Kevin Mannix, was also approved for the November election.

The main differences were:

1) Measure 61 has mandatory prison time for some first time felony offenders, while SB 1087 only does so for repeat offenders

2) SB 1087 significantly increases funding for drug treatment programs, while Measure 61 provides none.

3) Measure 61 will cost $250–$400 million per two year budget cycle, while SB 1087 would only cost $140 million.

If both measures pass, the one with the most votes will go into effect.

An increase in prison inmates since 1994
In 1994, Measure 11, an earlier initiative proposed by Kevin Mannix, was passed, which set mandatory minimum sentences for violent crimes. It is responsible for 28% of today's prison population. 
Oregon uses the highest percentage of its state budget to lock up criminals and supervise parole of any state. Oregon has seen a growth in prison inmates from about 4,000 to more than 13,500.

If SB 1087 or the initiative proposed by Mannix, is passed, Oregon's prison population and percentage of state budget will become more pronounced.
However, Oregon has seen an even greater drop in violent crime than the rest of the country on average since Measure 11 passed.

Support
Supporters include:

Organizations

 Measure 57 or The Better Way to Fight Crime Committee, which was a broad coalition of police officers, police chiefs, sheriffs, district attorneys, business leaders, teachers, parents, advocates for children and seniors and many more.
 Oregon Council of Police Associations
 Oregon Police Chiefs for Safer Communities
 Oregon Assoc. of Community Corrections Directors
 Federation of Oregon Parole and Probation Officers
 Juvenile Parole Officers – AFSCME Council 75
 AFSCME Corrections United
 Association of Oregon Corrections Employees
 Nominee, Oregon Attorney General, John Kroger
 AARP Oregon
 Stand for Children
 National Association of Social Workers-Oregon Chapter
 SEIU, Local 503, representing front-line workers at the Oregon Youth Authority, & 45,000 other workers
 SEIU, Local 49
 Oregon Prevention Education and Recovery Association
 Oregon Business Association
 Oregon Education Association
 Save Oregon Seniors
 Oregon State Council for Retired Citizens
 Advocacy Coalition for Seniors & People with Disabilities
 Oregon Alliance for Retired Americans
 Partnership for Safety & Justice
 Elders in Action Commission
 United Way of the Mid-Willamette Valley
 Ainsworth United Church of Christ, Justice Commission
 Community Action Relationship of Oregon
 Community Alliance of Tenants
 Community Providers Association of Oregon
 Human Services Coalition of Oregon (HSCO)
 Multnomah County Democrats
 Northwest Oregon Labor Council
 One Voice for Child Care
 Oregon AFL-CIO
 Oregon Consumer League
 Oregon Health Action Campaign
 Oregon Nurses Association
 Rural Organizing Project
 Association of Oregon Counties

Elected officials

Justices

Former Oregon Supreme Court Justice Betty Roberts

Attorneys General

Oregon Attorney General, Hardy Myers

Legislators

Sen. Floyd Prozanski, D-Oregon, who said the legislative measure was widely supported by prosecutors, police and jail officials who know a lot more about fighting crime than Mannix.

Sheriffs

Sheriff Southwick - Baker County
Sheriff Diana Simpson – Benton County
Sheriff Craig Roberts – Clackamas County
Sheriff Tom Bergin – Clatsop County
Sheriff Dennis Dotson – Lincoln County
Sheriff Bob Skipper – Multnomah County
Sheriff Todd Anderson – Tillamook County
Sheriff John Trumbo – Umatilla County
Sheriff Rasmussen, Union County
Sheriff Jack Crabtree – Yamhill County

District Attorneys

Matt Shirtcliff, Baker
John S. Foote, Clackamas
Joshua Marquis, Clatsop
Steve Atchison, Columbia
R. Paul Frasier, Coos
Everett Dial, Curry
Michael T. Dugan, Deschutes
Timothy J. Colahan, Harney
Marion Weatherford, Gilliam
Ryan Joslin, Grant
Edwin I. Caleb, Klamath
Mark Huddleston, Jackson
Peter Deuel, Jefferson
Stephen Campbell, Josephine
David Schutt, Lake
Bernice Barnett, Lincoln
Jason Carlile, Linn
Walt Beglau, Marion
Elizabeth Ballard, Morrow
Michael D. Schrunk, Multnomah
John Fisher, Polk
Wade M. McLeod, Sherman
William Porter, Tillamook
Dean F. Gushwa, Umatilla
Mona K. Williams, Wallowa
Eric Nisley, Wasco
Bob Hermann, Washington
Brad Berry, Yamhill

County Commissioners

Commissioner Annabelle Jaramillo - Benton County
Commissioner Jay Dixon - Benton County
Commissioner Don Lindly - Lincoln County
Commissioner Mary Stern - Yamhill County

City Councilors

City Councilor Betty Boche - Beaverton
City Councilor Denny Doyle - Beaverton
City Councilor Doug Pugsley - Dundee
Mayor Robert Austin - Estacada
Mayor Julie Hammerstad - Lake Oswego
Councilor Deborah Barnes, Milwaukie
Mayor Cheri Olson, North Plains

Others
 Rob Ingram, long-time youth advocate—Portland

A full list of supporters is available at the campaign website .

Opposition
Kevin Mannix continues to promote his Measure 61. "Either way, we make progress," Mannix says. "I win some if [Measure] 57 passes, and the people win more if 61 passes."

Loren Parks "With the financial help of Nevada medical-device millionaire Loren Parks, Mannix easily gathered 149,000 signatures to place Measure 61 on the ballot."

Oregon Anti-Crime Alliance: The Oregon Anti-Crime Alliance is a new organization that brings together citizens with a mission of reducing crime in Oregon through reforms affecting prevention, investigation, prosecution, the courts, indigent defense, accountability, transition programs out of prison, prison work, treatment and rehabilitation.

Some Republicans attacked the measure for being "soft-on-crime". Kevin Mannix continues to promote his "tough-on-crime" initiative while pointing out the weaknesses of the competing measure. "We shouldn't be patsies and let drug dealers and identity thieves and burglars get a free pass on their first convictions, which is what they get on the legislative referral", he said. 

For a citizen-initiated measure in Oregon, the ballot title is determined by the state's Attorney General. In the case of this measure, the legislature chose to supplant this process by inserting its own title.,

As of March, 2009, the number of counties that have sentenced pursuant Measure 57 sentences remains small.  The reason for this seems to be that defendants are willing to plea to a lesser sentence in order to avoid the longer sentences mandated by the Measure.

See also
Oregon Ballot Measure 61 (2008)
Methamphetamine in Oregon
List of Oregon ballot measures

References

External links
Better Way to Fight Crime Committee Yes on Measure 57
Published in West Linn Tidings I urge you to support Measure 57
2008 General Election : Voters' Pamphlet
StatesmanJournal.com: "Kroger backs alternative to crime measure", July 17, 2008
"Either anti-crime measure will cost over $1 billion, state says", Oregons Against Measure 11

Legislatively referred ballot measures
2008 Oregon ballot measures
Penal system in Oregon
Criminal penalty ballot measures in the United States